Advocare Incorporated is a Perth-based human rights organisation that provides support to older people and people with disabilities in Western Australia.
It is independent and not-for-profit and provides free information, education and advocacy services.

Help with elder abuse 
Elder abuse has been described as a "silent and shameful epidemic" in Australia, and is a social, medical and legal issue. It involves the mistreatment of an older person, often in their own home, and usually at the hands of those well known to them, such as family or friends. It can be defined as "any behaviour or action within a relationship of trust that harms an older person". It can include physical, social, emotional, psychological and sexual abuse, and neglect. Elder abuse can mean using an older person's money without their permission, restricting their freedoms, neglect or exploitative behaviour, and physical and psychological abuse.
Elder abuse is currently under-reported though it is estimated that 1 in 20 Australian seniors will experience it.
Advocare Inc. has a helpline that responds to calls regarding issues around aged care, elder abuse and older people's rights. The helpline directly responds to elder abuse issues and provides impartial, professional advice and advocacy to elderly people in need of legal and emotional support. Red flags for elder abuse might include not being able to pay bills, withdrawal from social networks, changes to a will, unexplained disappearances of possessions, or unusual activity on credit cards or bank statements. "Inheritance impatience" is an example of financial elder abuse that causes older people to suffer at the hands of their children, as well as offspring carrying a "distorted influence of a sense of entitlement" leading to financial mismanagement. Elder abuse is "not currently on people's radars to the same extent as domestic violence and child abuse" however it is a very common and unrecognised phenomenon.

Help with aged care complaints 
Advocare responds to aged care complaints which have seen a recent spike in Australia.  Advocare provides confidential assistance and professional recommendations with issues such as catering, hygiene, equipment, comfort and safety within aged care services and facilities. Advocates within the organisation assist by helping older people and their loved ones explore their options, and provide tools to allow for informed decisions regarding care. Advocare also responds to concerns brought forward by aged care workers who are able to report changes in an older person's behaviour or any suspicious circumstances. Aged care workers retain an important role in providing a communication link for older people to reach legal and emotional assistance.

Services for Indigenous Australians 
Many Indigenous Australians have experienced historically significant challenges. Indigenous Australians have been dramatically affected by white colonisation in Australia and may be eligible for aged care services at a younger age than non-Indigenous Australians. Some groups use the term "family violence against aunties and uncles" in place of "elder abuse". The incidence of abuse of older people can be particularly high in Indigenous communities that can be related back to important factors such as dispossession of land and culture, separation of families, and racist attitudes and treatment leading to unemployment, drug and alcohol abuse, and poverty.   Advocare Inc. provides support and advice for older Indigenous Australians who are suffering from mistreatment, unsure of their rights, or dissatisfied with their care. An Indigenous advocate is appointed to deal with their issues- which can be culturally specific and require special attention.

Milestones and key community involvement 
Advocare hosted the 2014 National Elder Abuse Conference.

Official website link 
http://www.advocare.org.au/

References 

Organisations based in Perth, Western Australia
Disability rights organizations
Elder rights activists